The 1953 Virginia Cavaliers football team represented the University of Virginia during the 1953 college football season. The Cavaliers were led by first-year head coach Ned McDonald and played their home games at Scott Stadium in Charlottesville, Virginia. The team compiled a record of 1–8. This was the last season in which Virginia competed as an independent, as they join the newly-formed Atlantic Coast Conference (ACC) the following year.

Schedule

References

Virginia
Virginia Cavaliers football seasons
Virginia Cavaliers football